Josiah Francis Wedgwood, also known as Josiah Wedgwood VII (February 1, 1950- November 27, 2009) was an American physician and paediatric immunologist.

In 1982 he married Ruth Glushien, daughter of Morris P. Glushien.  They had one son, Josiah Ruskin Wedgwood (born 1998).

Wedgwood died unexpectedly on November 27, 2009, while in Paris to meet his family for Thanksgiving, from an undetermined cause.

References

Additional sources 
 http://www.timesonline.co.uk/tol/comment/obituaries/article6971872.ece Times obituary
 http://www.primaryimmune.org/admin_content/admin_files/12-17-09_TributetoJosiahWedgwood.pdf
 http://wedgwoodfamily.blogspot.com/2010/01/dr-josiah-francis-wedgwood-1950-2009.html
 J Allergy Clin Immunol. 2010 Feb;125(2):506. Epub 2009 Dec 29.
 https://www.washingtonpost.com/wp-dyn/content/article/2009/12/25/AR2009122501834.html Washington post obituary

1950 births
2009 deaths
American immunologists
American pediatricians
Darwin–Wedgwood family